Rainbow High School is a private, co-educational, inter-denominational school located in Gaborone city, Botswana. It was opened in 1998. The school comprises a primary school, preparatory (middle) school, and a high school.

History
The school began as a primary school in 1997 with one form, and then in 1998 it opened a high school. The school initially had capacity for 75 students and had only seven teachers. The school now has more than 600 students and more than 50 staff.

Haircut controversy
In 2017, the school caused controversy by sending a memo to parents of black students informing them that afro haircuts would not be allowed. The school reversed the decision after an intervention by actor Donald Molosi.

References

External links
 

Schools in Botswana
Mixed-sex education
Educational institutions established in 1998